The 1997 SWAC men's basketball tournament was held March 6–8, 1997, at the Riverside Centroplex in Baton Rouge, Louisiana.  defeated , 81–74 in the championship game. The Tigers received the conference's automatic bid to the 1997 NCAA tournament as No. 16 seed in the Southeast Region.

Bracket and results

References

1996–97 Southwestern Athletic Conference men's basketball season
SWAC men's basketball tournament